WCCC may refer to:

 WCCC (FM), a radio station (106.9 FM) licensed to serve Hartford, Connecticut, United States
 WNWW, a radio station (1290 AM) licensed to serve West Hartford, Connecticut, which held the call sign WCCC from 1947 to 2002 and from 2007 to 2016
 Warren County Community College
 Warwickshire County Cricket Club, a county cricket team from England
 Washington County Community College in Calais, Maine, United States
 Weak cosmic censorship hypothesis
 Western Collegiate Cycling Conference
 Westmoreland County Community College, in Youngwood, Pennsylvania, United States
 Wilkinson County Correctional Center, a prison in Wilkinson County, Mississippi, United States
 Willow Creek Community Church, a church in South Barrington, Illinois, United States
 Women's Community Correctional Center, a women's prison in Honolulu County, Hawai'i. 
 Worcestershire County Cricket Club, a county cricket team from England
 World Computer Chess Championship
 World Covered Court Championships, a tennis tournament